The Clothes Show is a British television show about fashion that was broadcast on BBC One from 1986 to 2000, and from 2006 on UKTV Style and Really. At its height, The Clothes Show had around 9 million viewers every Sunday night. It also spawned a live event that has outlived the TV show.

BBC series (1986-2000)
The Clothes Show was first broadcast on 13 October 1986, with Breakfast Time'''s Selina Scott and designer Jeff Banks as its first hosts. The show combined reports from the catwalks with items on how to achieve a catwalk-type look on a reasonable budget. Selina and Jeff were later joined by Caryn Franklin (a former Fashion Editor and co-Editor of international style magazine i-D), who took over as Banks' main co-host after Scott left.

Such was the success of the show that in 1989 the annual Clothes Show Live event was launched at Birmingham's National Exhibition Centre, and later a magazine was produced to accompany the programme. The programme continued on the BBC until the late 1990s, with other presenters over the years including Margherita Taylor, Tim Vincent, Richard Jobson and Brenda Emmanus. Series producers included Collette Foster and Jane Lomas, who had been a presenter on the earliest shows. James Strong, Mike Prince, Mark Westcott and Ann Wilson were among the directors. The Clothes Show Live event continues to be held annually at the beginning of each December.

Theme tune
The show's original theme music in 1986 was the Shep Pettibone remix of Five Star's then-recent hit "Find the Time".
From 1987 onwards the theme tune was an excerpt from Arthur Baker's remix of the Pet Shop Boys' song "In The Night" which can be found on the 1986 Disco album. The original version of the song was on the b-side of the 1985 single "Opportunities (Let's Make Lots of Money)".

In 1995 Pet Shop Boys were asked by the BBC to remix the theme tune for a revamped version of the show. This new version appeared as a A-side and B-side to the 1996 single "Before" and can now be found on the 2001 reissue of their 1996 album Bilingual and on their Format b-side compilation album.

Saint Etienne were also asked to produce a theme tune for the show, but it was turned down. Their theme was eventually released on the fanclub-only album Built on Sand.

UKTV Style/Really series (2006–2009)
On 7 August 2006, The Sun newspaper reported that The Clothes Show'' was to be resurrected after six years and would be shown on UKTV Style, hosted by Louise Redknapp, Caryn Franklin and Brendan Courtney. The programme moved from UKTV Style to a new channel called Really in 2009.

YouTube series (2013)
The people behind Clothes Show Live brought the show back as "Clothes Show TV" in 2013  . The organisation continued to publish short videos on YouTube until 2018.

References

External links
 The NEC, Birmingham
 
 Clothes Show Live - Official website

1986 British television series debuts
2000 British television series endings
2006 British television series debuts
2009 British television series endings
1990s British television series
2000s British television series
BBC Television shows
Fashion-themed television series
UKTV original programming